Visit Indonesia Year was a New Order Indonesia inaugurated series of years of promoting Indonesia to the world tourism industry. It was considered as part of the Visit Indonesia Decade. The Years were announced by Suharto at the beginning of each year during his time in power, and it was his presidential decisions that made the operation of the years function within the governmental process. As part of the 1994–1995 - 1999–2000 five-year plan, the government set a target of 6.5 million foreign tourists, bringing in  billion in foreign exchange, with 84.2 million domestic tourists spending Rp9 trillion. It was hoped that tourism would generate 900,000 new jobs.

The first year was the Visit Indonesia Year 1991. The last major campaign was Visit Indonesia Year 2008 that launched to commemorate 100 years of Indonesian National Awakening in 1908. In January 2011, the "Visit Indonesia" branding was discontinued and changed to the “Wonderful Indonesia” campaign.

Visit Indonesia Decade themes

Were set as:

 1993 - Environment Year (Lingkungan Hidup)
 1994 - The Role of Women in Development, Youth and Sports Year 
 1995 - 50 Years Anniversary of Republic of Indonesia's Independence (Golden Anniversary)
 1996 - Sea and Air Year
 1997 - Telecommunications Year
 1998 - Art and Culture Year
 1999 - Craft and Engineering Year
 2000 - Using the Technology for Raising the Standard of Living Year

It was re-continued after some years of absence in 2008 with the theme of Celebrating 100 years of National Awakening.
 2008 - Celebration of 100th Anniversary of National Awakening. During this campaign the logo of stylized colorful curves of Garuda was introduced.
 2008 to 2010 - The Visit Indonesia branding was still in use, however without specific theme as it was in 2008.
 2025 - Celebration of the 80th Anniversary of an Indonesian Independence.
 2028 - Celebration of the 100th Anniversary of the Youth Pledge.

Branding change
In January 2011, Indonesian Ministry of Culture and Tourism launched the “Wonderful Indonesia” campaign. The "Wonderful Indonesia" campaign replaced the previous "Visit Indonesia Year" branding used by the nations official tourism promotional campaigns since 1991 and was reactivated in 2008, although the logo of stylized curves Garuda remain.

See also
Tourism in Indonesia

References

Tourism in Indonesia
Indonesian brands
Tourism campaigns
Suharto
New Order (Indonesia)
Advertising in Indonesia